, real name Chigusa Kusaka, is a fictional character from the video game series .hack//G.U. by CyberConnect2. Atoli is a player character from the online game "The World" where she works for the Guild Moon Tree. During the narrative, Atoli tries to make the antisocial player Haseo into enjoying the world and both end up having argument due to their different ideologies. Guild Moon's member Sasaki starts manipulating her during the second volume of the series as she is manipulated by a virus known as AIDA. She also appears in the printed adaptations of the series as well as the film .hack//G.U. Trilogy among other media.

Atoli was created by CyberConnect2 CEO Hiroshi Matsuyama who feared her characterization in the first installment of the trilogy as he did not find her as an appealing heroine due to how she interacts with the protagonist Haseo. She is voiced by Ayako Kawasumi in Japanese and Bridget Hoffman in English. Critical reception to Atoli has been mostly positive, mostly due to her role in Trilogy based on her personality and relationship with Haseo. In regards to her actress, while Kawasumi's work was met with praise, Hoffman was often criticized.

Creation and development

Although Atoli was intended to be the main heroine, the team had issues while writing her to the point that director Hiroshi Matsuyama himself chose other characters to romance when playing the game alone. Haseo can pursue a romance with certain other characters over the course of the games. Matsuyama laughed quietly about what he should do as he felt that he disliked Atoli. This was mostly due to her misrelationship with Haseo due to multiple scenes from the first installment having them in arguments, making Atoli's characterization unrealistic. The staff agreed with Matsuyama's concern. This motivated Matsuyama to make her more appealing for the second chapter of .hack//G.U., aiming her to be a more fitting heroine. 

The second game is subtitled "The Voice that Thinks of You" in Japanese; Matsuyama says this refers to the web of relationships between characters, including how Haseo remembers Shino's voice, how Atoli thinks of Haseo, and most importantly what Ovan means to Haseo. Atoli's design was mix between Western and Eastern culture with a bird theme forming her naming and design. 

Kawasumi also enjoyed voicing her character across thee series. Although initially centered on Haseo, Matsuyama wanted the film Trilogy to explore Atoli's character furthermore and how she is connected to Haseo's quest of revenge. Haseo's Japanese actor, Takahiro Sakurai, claimed that he and Kawasumi had been given freedom during the recording of the film.

Appearances
Atoli is a pacifist Harvest Cleric who is a part of the guild Moon Tree under Sakaki's command. Overhearing Haseo badmouthing her guild, Atoli forcefully gives Haseo her member address and invites him to several adventures to teach him the Moon Tree as well as her ideology. As they went on adventures together, Atoli grows attached to Haseo and harbors feeling for him. However, upon learning that Haseo was drawn to her because she used a nearly-identical Player Character to Shino, and thus, had only been looking for Shino in her, Atoli is heartbroken. Desperate to gain Haseo's acceptance, Atoli tried to look for Tri-Edge by going to an area inaccessible to regular players, found inside one the Tri-Edge marks. She is later revealed to be an Epitaph user of the Second Phase, Innis the Mirage of Deceit. After Haseo defeated Azure Flame Kite, whom he believed to be Tri-Edge, Atoli is attacked by an AIDA. Her Epitaph was stolen from the attack, rendering her arm paralyzed in the real world.

In the second installment, Atoli reconciles with Haseo after their argument regarding Shino. Determined to become stronger, Atoli participates in the tournament together with Haseo and Alkaid despite her paralyzed hand. During the game, Atoli develops a rivalry with Alkaid for Haseo's affection, but the two girls eventually get along with each other. After Atoli regained her Epitaph, Sakaki infects her with AIDA, forcefully awakening her Avatar and went on a rampage until Haseo saved her. She later confronts Sakaki and finally cut ties with him. When Ovan is revealed to be the Tri-Edge that Haseo is looking for, Atoli is attacked and lost her consciousness for a moment, but soon awakened.

At the end of the .hack//G.U. trilogy, she sees Haseo with Shino at the cathedral because she received an e-mail from Shino herself requesting her presence in the cathedral. After a few words she runs away heartbroken thinking that her relationship with Haseo has ended, but is surprised when she sees Haseo running towards her. In Reconnection, a new story added to .hack//G.U. HD remaster, Atoli returns to the world, angry with Haseo for keeping his work to find Ovan in secret from her.

The manga .hack//G.U.+ explores Atoli's real player, Clair, once AIDA disappeared from The World. Clair meets Haseo's player, Ryou Misaki, who quits from The World after defeating Ovan and saved Shino. Clair tries to convince Ryou to return to The World, but he declines until Ovan's younger sister Aina request to meet him in The World and a new threat resurfaces. Atoli is also present in the game's novelization and the film .hack//G.U.: Trilogy. She is also featured in the video game .hack//Link. In the .hack//4koma, Clair creates a new character, Peaco, to trick Haseo as a new player needing help.

Reception

Atoli has been a popular character, appearing in multiple polls from the series, which lead to merchandising featuring her. Critical reception to Atoli has been positive. GamesRadar regarded to Atoli as a foil to Haseo based on her personality but noted their relationship is awkward. Siliconera found that despite her calm her personality, the character often attacks enemies on her own and recommended players to protect her due to her useful healing magic. WorthPlaying described her as "Haseo's pseudo-girlfriend" and noted how she becomes a more important character in the series's second installment. RPGamer praised her scenes and Alkaid's as due to her contributions to the plot Haseo starts developing into a more mature character. Cheat Code Central regarded to Atoli losing her voice as an important event in the storyline as it shows more the dangers of AIDA. In regards to her English voice actress, RPGFan said that due to the amount of lines Atoli has, her character's deliveries are "hit or miss". Worth Playing agreed due to how Atoli and Alkaid's English voices annoyed him to the point he preferred the game mute. GameSpew agreed, stating Gaspard and had the worst English voices.

Critics have also commented in regards to Atoli's role from Trilogy. Carl Kimlinger from Anime News Network referred to Haseo's and Atoli's relationship as one of the best parts from the film .hack//G.U. Trilogy, pointing to the scene in which the former confronts the latter's AIDA-infected. He called Haseo an "unsympathetic bastard of a lead" though for his antisocial and aggressive manners. The Fandom Post had mixed thoughts about the narrative but felt Haseo's interactions with Ovan and Atoli are the best points. Capsule Monsters regarded it as an "absolute mess" due to the narrative attempts to introduce multiple characters in little time but still felt the character arc Haseo has with Atoli to be one of the film's strongest points. The reviewer also regarded Atoli's character as one of the strongest ones in the film. Paul Jensen from Anime News Network stated that while Atoli is likable, her relationship with Haseo was not well developed. Both Haseo and Atoli's actors, Takahiro Sakurai and Ayako Kawasumi, were highly praised for their work in the OVA. ANN enjoyed Kawasumi's vocal range of emotions to Atoli but was had mixed thoughts about how Sakurai can make Haseo more likable despite his striking performance. PopCultureShock found her as a likable character in the manga due to how her soft demeanor and wishes despite her naivety personality. Manga News criticized the handling of Atoli's love triangle with Haseo and Shino in the fourth volume, considering it a reboot of the manga.

References

Female characters in anime and manga
Female characters in video games
Role-playing video game characters
Science fantasy video game characters
Teenage characters in video games
Video game characters introduced in 2006
Video game bosses